Engela is an electoral constituency in the Ohangwena Region of northern Namibia. It had 21,341 inhabitants in 2004 and 13,743 registered voters . It is named after the settlement of Engela, today part of the town Helao Nafidi. Engela is home to one of the biggest hospitals in Namibia, Engela State Hospital.

Politics
As is common in all constituencies of former Ovamboland, Namibia's ruling SWAPO Party has dominated elections since independence. 

In the 2015 regional election SWAPO won by a landslide. Its candidate Jason Ndakunda gathered 5,372 votes, while the only opposition candidate, Laban Kanyiki of the Rally for Democracy and Progress (RDP), received 574 votes. The 2020 regional election was also won by the SWAPO candidate. Elkan Hainghumbi received 4,431 votes, far ahead of Ngenokesho Nandeukeni of the Independent Patriots for Change (IPC), an opposition party formed in August 2020, who obtained 867 votes.

References 

Helao Nafidi
Constituencies of Ohangwena Region
States and territories established in 1992
1992 establishments in Namibia